Prisoje is a village in the municipalities of Jezero, Republika Srpska and Jajce, Bosnia and Herzegovina.

Demographics 
According to the 2013 census, its population was 145, with 106 Serbs living in the Jezero part and the rest living in the Jajce part.

References

Populated places in Jezero, Bosnia and Herzegovina
Populated places in Jajce
Villages in Republika Srpska